Amedeo Bruni (18 October 1906 – 2 November 1991) was an Italian sports shooter. He competed in the 50 m rifle, prone event at the 1932 Summer Olympics.

References

External links
 

1906 births
1991 deaths
Italian male sport shooters
Olympic shooters of Italy
Shooters at the 1932 Summer Olympics
Sportspeople from the Province of Ascoli Piceno